Beijing cuisine, also known as Jing cuisine, Mandarin cuisine and Peking cuisine and formerly as Beiping cuisine, is the local cuisine of Beijing, the national capital of China.

Background
As Beijing has been the capital of China for centuries, its cuisine is influenced by culinary traditions from all over China, but the style that has the greatest influence on Beijing cuisine is that of the eastern coastal province of Shandong. Beijing cuisine has itself, in turn, also greatly influenced other Chinese cuisines, particularly the cuisine of Liaoning, the Chinese imperial cuisine and the Chinese aristocrat cuisine.

Another tradition that influenced Beijing cuisine (as well as influenced by the latter itself) is the Chinese imperial cuisine that originated from the "Emperor's Kitchen", which referred to the cooking facilities inside the Forbidden City, where thousands of cooks from different parts of China showed their best culinary skills to please the imperial family and officials. Therefore, it is sometimes difficult to determine the actual origin of a dish as the term "Mandarin" is generalised and refers not only to Beijing, but other provinces as well. However, some generalisation of Beijing cuisine can be characterised as follows: Foods that originated in Beijing are often snacks rather than main courses, and they are typically sold by small shops or street vendors. There is emphasis on dark soy paste, sesame paste, sesame oil and scallions, and fermented tofu is often served as a condiment. In terms of cooking techniques, methods relating to different ways of frying are often used. There is less emphasis on rice as an accompaniment as compared to many other regions in China, as local rice production in Beijing is limited by the relatively dry climate.

Many dishes in Beijing cuisine that are served as main courses are derived from a variety of Chinese Halal foods, particularly lamb and beef dishes, as well as from Huaiyang cuisine.

Huaiyang cuisine has been praised since ancient times in China and it was a general practice for an official travelling to Beijing to take up a new post to bring along with him a chef specialising in Huaiyang cuisine. When these officials had completed their terms in the capital and returned to their native provinces, most of the chefs they brought along often remained in Beijing. They opened their own restaurants or were hired by wealthy locals. The imperial clan of the Ming dynasty, the House of Zhu, who had ancestry from Jiangsu Province, also contributed greatly in introducing Huaiyang cuisine to Beijing when the capital was moved from Nanjing to Beijing in the 15th century, because the imperial kitchen was mainly Huaiyang style. The element of traditional Beijing culinary and gastronomical cultures of enjoying artistic performances such as Beijing opera while dining directly developed from the similar practice in the culture of Jiangsu and Huaiyang cuisines.

Chinese Islamic cuisine is another important component of Beijing cuisine and was first prominently introduced when Beijing became the capital of the Yuan dynasty. However, the most significant contribution to the formation of Beijing cuisine came from Shandong cuisine, as most chefs from Shandong Province came to Beijing en masse during the Qing dynasty. Unlike the earlier two cuisines, which were brought by the ruling class such as nobles, aristocrats and bureaucrats and then spread to the general populace, the introduction of Shandong cuisine begun with serving the general populace, with much wider market segment, from wealthy merchants to the working class.

History
The Qing dynasty was a major period in the formation of Beijing cuisine. Before the Boxer Rebellion, the foodservice establishments in Beijing were strictly stratified by the foodservice guild. Each category of the establishment was specifically based on its ability to provide for a particular segment of the market. The top ranking establishments served nobles, aristocrats, and wealthy merchants and landlords, while lower ranking establishments served the populace of lower financial and social status. It was during this period when Beijing cuisine gained fame and became recognised by the Chinese culinary society, and the stratification of the foodservice was one of its most obvious characteristics as part of its culinary and gastronomic cultures during this first peak of its formation.

The official stratification was an integral part of the local culture of Beijing and it was not finally abolished officially after the end of the Qing dynasty, which resulted in the second peak in the formation of Beijing cuisine. Meals previously offered to nobles and aristocrats were made available to anyone who could afford them instead of being restricted only to the upper class. As chefs freely switched between jobs offered by different establishments, they brought their skills that further enriched and developed Beijing cuisine. Though the stratification of food services in Beijing was no longer effected by imperial laws, the structure more or less remained despite continuous weakening due to the financial background of the local clientele. The different classes are listed in the following subsections.

Zhuang 
Zhuang, or zhuang zihao were the top-ranking foodservice establishments, not only in providing foods, but entertainment as well. The form of entertainment provided was usually Beijing opera, and establishments of this class always had long-term contracts with an opera troupe to perform onsite or contracts with famous performers, such as national-treasure-class performers, to perform onsite, though not on a daily basis. Establishments of this category only accepted customers who came as a group and ordered banquets by appointment, and the banquets provided by establishments of this category often included most, if not all tables, at the site. The bulk foodservice business was catering at customers' homes or other locations, often for birthdays, marriages, funerals, promotions and other important celebrations and festivals. When catering, these establishments not only provided what was on the menu, but fulfilled customers' requests.

Leng zhuangzi lacked any rooms to host banquets, and thus their business was purely catering.

Tang 
Tang, or tang zihao, are similar to zhuang establishments, but the business of these second-class establishments were generally evenly divided among onsite banquet hosting and catering (at customers' homes). Establishments of this class would also have long-term contracts with Beijing opera troupes to perform onsite, but they did not have long-term contracts with famous performers, such as national-treasure-class performers, to perform onsite on regular basis; however these top performers would still perform at establishments of this category occasionally. In terms of catering at the customers' sites, establishments of this category often only provided dishes strictly according to their menu.

Ting 
Ting, or ting zihao are foodservice establishments which had more business in onsite banquet hosting than catering at customers' homes. For onsite banquet hosting, entertainment was still provided, but establishments of this category did not have long-term contracts with Beijing opera troupes, so that performers varied from time to time, and top performers usually did not perform here or at any lower-ranking establishments. For catering, different establishments of this category were incapable of handling significant catering on their own, but generally had to combine resources with other establishments of the same ranking (or lower) to do the job.

Yuan 

Yuan, or yuan zihao did nearly all their business in hosting banquets onsite. Entertainment was not provided on a regular basis, but there were stages built onsite for Beijing opera performers. Instead of being hired by the establishments like in the previous three categories, performers at establishments of this category were usually contractors who paid the establishment to perform and split the earnings according to a certain percentage. Occasionally, establishments of this category would be called upon to help cater at customers' homes, but had to work with others, never taking the lead as establishments like the ting.

Lou 
Lou, or lou zihao did the bulk of their business hosting banquets onsite by appointment. In addition, a smaller portion of the business was in serving different customers onsite on a walk-in basis. Occasionally, when catering at customers' homes, establishments of this category would only provide the few specialty dishes they were famous for.

Ju 
Ju, or ju zihao generally divided their business evenly into two areas: serving different customers onsite on a walk-in basis, and hosting banquets by appointment for customers who came as one group. Occasionally, when catering at the customers' homes, establishments of this category would only provide the few specialty dishes they were famous for, just like the lou. However, unlike those establishments, which always cooked their specialty dishes on location, establishment of this category would either cook on location or simply bring the already-cooked food to the location.

Zhai 
Zhai, or zhai zihao were mainly in the business of serving different customers onsite on a walk-in basis, but a small portion of their income did come from hosting banquets by appointment for customers who came as one group. Similar to the ju, when catering at customers’ homes, establishments of this category would also only provide the few specialty dishes they are famous for, but they would mostly bring the already-cooked dishes to the location, and would only cook on location occasionally.

Fang 
Fang, or fang zihao. Foodservice establishments of this category generally did not offer the service of hosting banquets made by appointment for customers who came as one group, but instead, often only offered to serve different customers onsite on a walk-in basis. Establishments of this category or lower would not be called upon to perform catering at the customers' homes for special events.

Guan 
Guan, or guan zihao. Foodservice establishments of this category mainly served different customers onsite on a walk-in basis, and in addition, a portion of the income would be earned from selling to-goes.

Dian 
Dian, or dian zihao. Foodservice establishments of this category had their own place, like all previous categories, but serving different customers to dine onsite on a walk-in basis only provided half of the overall income, while the other half came from selling to-goes.

Pu 
Pu, or pu zihao. Foodservice establishments of this category ranked next to the last, and they were often named after the owners' last names.  Establishments of this category had fixed spots of business for having their own places, but smaller than dian, and thus did not have tables, but only seats for customers. As a result, the bulk of the income of establishments of this category was from selling to-goes, while income earned from customers dining onsite only provided a small portion of the overall income.

Tan 
Tan, or tan zihao. The lowest ranking foodservice establishments without any tables, and selling to-goes was the only form of business. In addition to name the food stand after the owners' last name or the food sold, these food stands were also often named after the owners' nicknames.

Notable dishes and street foods

Meat and poultry dishes

Fish and seafood dishes

Noodles (both vegetarian and non-vegetarian)

Pastries

Vegetarian

Beijing Delicacies
 Deep-Fried Pie
 Soy Bean Curd

Restaurants known for Beijing cuisine
Numerous traditional restaurants in Beijing are credited with great contributions in the formation of Beijing cuisine, but many of them have gone out of business. However, some of them managed to survive until today, and some of them are:

Bai Kui (白魁): established in 1780
Bao Du Feng (爆肚冯): established in 1881, also known as Ji Sheng Long (金生隆)
Bianyifang: established in 1416, the oldest surviving restaurant in Beijing
Cha Tang Li (茶汤李), established in 1858
Dao Xiang Chun (稻香春): established in 1916
Dao Xian Cun (稻香村): established in 1895
De Shun Zhai (大顺斋): established in the early 1870s
Dong Lai Shun (东来顺): established in 1903
Dong Xin Shun (东兴顺): also known as Bao Du Zhang (爆肚张), established in 1883
Du Yi Chu (都一处): established in 1738
Dou Fu Nao Bai (豆腐脑白): established in 1877, also known as Xi Yu Zhai (西域斋)
En Yuan Ju (恩元居), established in 1929
Fang Sheng Zhai (芳生斋), also known as Nai Lao Wei (奶酪魏), established in 1857
Hong Bin Lou (鸿宾楼): established in 1853 in Tianjin, relocated to Beijing in 1955.
Jin Sheng Long (金生隆): established in 1846
Kao Rou Ji (烤肉季): established in 1828
Kao Rou Wan (烤肉宛): established in 1686
Liu Bi Ju (六必居) established in 1530
Liu Quan Ju (柳泉居): established in the late 1560s, the second oldest surviving restaurant in Beijing
Nan Lai Shun (南来顺): established in 1937
Nian Gao Qian (年糕钱): established in early 1880s
Quanjude (全聚德): established in 1864
Rui Bin Lou (瑞宾楼): originally established in 1876
Sha Guoo Ju (砂锅居), established in 1741
Tian Fu Hao (天福号): established in 1738
Tian Xing Ju (天兴居):, established in 1862
Tian Yuan Jian Yuan (天源酱园): established in 1869
Wang Zhi He (王致和): established in 1669
Wonton Hou (馄饨侯): established in 1949
Xi De Shun (西德顺): also known as Bao Du Wang (爆肚王), established in 1904
Xi Lai Shun (西来顺): established in 1930
Xian Bing Zhou (馅饼周): established in 1910s, also known as Tong Ju Guan (同聚馆)
Xiao Chang Chen (小肠陈): established in the late 19th century
Xin Yuan Zhai (信远斋), established in 1740
Yang Tou Man (羊头马): established in the late 1830s
Yi Tiao Long (壹条龙): established in 1785

References

External links

 China Odyssey Tours: Beijing Meals

 
Regional cuisines of China